Cheltenham railway station or Cheltenham station may refer to:
Cheltenham station (Metra) in Chicago, Illinois, United States
Cheltenham station (SEPTA) in Cheltenham, Pennsylvania, United States
Cheltenham railway station, Melbourne, Victoria, Australia 
Cheltenham railway station, Sydney, New South Wales, Australia
Cheltenham railway station, Adelaide, South Australia
Cheltenham Spa railway station, in the United Kingdom
Cheltenham Racecourse railway station (now on the Gloucestershire Warwickshire Railway), in the United Kingdom
Disused railway stations in the United Kingdom:
Cheltenham High Street railway station
Cheltenham High Street Halt railway station
Cheltenham South and Leckhampton railway station
Cheltenham Spa Malvern Road railway station
Cheltenham Spa St. James railway station